Anarsia psammobia is a moth in the family Gelechiidae. It was described by Mark I. Falkovitsh and Oleksiy V. Bidzilya in 2003. It is found in Uzbekistan.

References

psammobia
Moths described in 2003
Moths of Asia